David McConnell could refer to: 

David H. McConnell (1858-1937), American businessman
David McConnell (musician), American musician and artist
Dave McConnell (born 1981), Scottish rugby league footballer